The 1947–48 season was Chelsea Football Club's thirty-fourth competitive season.

Table

References

External links
 1947–48 season at stamford-bridge.com

1947–48
English football clubs 1947–48 season